Issie Barratt (born 29 November 1964) is a British composer, known for her work in Big Band jazz and jazz education.

Career
Issie has been awarded commissions by the Philharmonia Orchestra, The Orchestra of the Age of Enlightenment, Bohuslän Big Band, The PRS Foundation for New Music, Delta Sax Quartet, 4th Dimension String Quartet, Voice of the North, North Cheshire Wind Orchestra, Vortex Foundation Big Band, Swiss Gemeinderat of Unterägeri, Trinity College of Music’s Contemporary Jazz Ensemble, Conservatoires UK Big Band and Youth Music with performances often featuring artists such as Anders Bergcrantz, Tim Garland, Mark Lockheart, Joe Locke, Dennis Rollins, Carl Rütti, Steve Waterman and Annie Whitehead.

As an educator
Issie was responsible for establishing Trinity College of Music’s Jazz Faculty in 1999, which she continued to run until 2006, before holding the position of Senior Jazz Fellow until 2012. As well as directing ensembles from Trinity College of Music, Barratt has also co-directed the Conservatoires UK Big Band 2003-2008 performing annually at Leeds College of Music’s International Jazz conference (alongside fellow artists and educators Bob Mintzer, Tim Garland, Mike Hall, Julian Joseph, Gerard Presencer, Mike Gibbs and Mark Donlon), appearing with CUK Big Band Tim Garland  the International Association of Jazz Educators’s Conference in 2008. Issie has also led various projects at the Royal Academy of Music, the Royal Northern College of Music and the Royal College of Music, contributed to the Associated Board of the Royal Schools of Music’s jazz syllabi and written several research papers on jazz related topics. Since September 2006 Barratt has held the position of Founding Artistic Director for the National Youth Jazz Collective (initially funded by Youth Music before becoming an Arts Council England National Portfolio Organisation in 2015). Issie's also an active Board Director of BASCA (the British Academy of Composers and Songwriters) and chair of BASCA's Jazz Committee, Jazz adjudicator for Music for Youth’s annual national festival, Issie is the founding director of Fuzzy Moon Records. She was winner of Jazz Educator of the Year at the 2014 Parliamentary Awards.

Discography
As a leader

2008: Astral Pleasures (Fuzzy Moon Records)
2011: Meinrad Iten Suite (Fuzzy Moon Records)
Other

2008: Letter to Billie - Bohuslän Big Band (Track: Strange Fruit)
2007: Dedicated to You ... But You Weren't Listening: The Music of Soft Machine - Delta Saxophone Quartet (Track: Somehow with the passage of time)

References

External links
 

1964 births
Living people
British jazz saxophonists
British jazz composers
British music educators
21st-century saxophonists
Women jazz saxophonists
Women jazz composers
21st-century women musicians
Women music educators